Arizona Department of Health Services (ADHS) is a state agency of Arizona, headquartered in Downtown Phoenix. The agency provides health services to the state's population.

Directors
 Will Humble (2009–2015)
 Dr. Cara Christ (2015–2021)
 Don Herrington (2021–present)

References

External links

 Arizona Department of Health Services

Health Services
State departments of health of the United States
Medical and health organizations based in Arizona